Alison Weisz (born May 22, 1995) is an American rifle shooter. In 2020, she qualified to represent the United States at the 2020 Summer Olympics in Tokyo.

Early life and education
Weisz was born in Rapid City, South Dakota and grew-up in Belgrade, Montana. Weiss first learned to shoot a gun at age 9 when her family enrolled her in a firearm safety class. She graduated from Belgrade High School in 2013. She attended University of Mississippi.

Career
A month after graduating for the University of Mississippi, Weisz joined the United States national shooting team and won her first competition. In 2018, Weisz came in second at the Championship of the Americas. The following year she won a gold medal at the Pan American Games Lima. In 2020, she qualified for the United States Olympic team for the 2020 Summer Olympics in Tokyo.

She is a specialist in the United States Army and serves in the Army Marksmanship Unit at Fort Benning, Georgia.

References

1995 births
Living people
American military Olympians
University of Mississippi alumni
People from Belgrade, Montana
Pan American Games gold medalists for the United States
Sportspeople from Rapid City, South Dakota
American female sport shooters
Pan American Games medalists in shooting
Shooters at the 2019 Pan American Games
Medalists at the 2019 Pan American Games
Olympic shooters of the United States
Shooters at the 2020 Summer Olympics
United States Army soldiers
21st-century American women
20th-century American women